Coconut Creek is a city in Broward County, Florida, United States. It is part of the Miami-Fort Lauderdale-West Palm Beach, FL Metropolitan Statistical Area. The city seceded from Pompano Beach in the 1960s. It is nicknamed "Butterfly Capital of the World" because it is home to Butterfly World, the world's largest butterfly aviary, with over 80 species and 20,000 individual butterflies.

Characteristics
Housing is primarily single-family homes, condominiums, and townhouses within professionally landscaped communities.

The city took its name from the coconut trees, that were planted in the area by early developers. Robert E. Bateman, one of the developers, named Coconut Creek after combining the names of Miami-Dade County's village of Indian Creek and the Miami neighborhood of Coconut Grove.

According to the 2010 United States Census, the city had a population of 52,909. Coconut Creek is part of the Miami–Fort Lauderdale–Pompano Beach Metropolitan Statistical Area, which was home to 5,564,635 people at the 2010 census.

The city is a well-planned community with a unique environmental consciousness touting an abundance of trees, waterways, landscaped roads, parks, and butterfly gardens throughout the neighborhoods. This is due to the city's progressive planning approach to creating a unique life-style for residents and businesses. Coconut Creek is the first in the state of Florida and eleventh in the country to be certified as a "Community Wildlife Habitat".

Playful City USA, a national program advocating for local policies that increase play opportunities for children and is a key platform in combating the play deficit, named Coconut Creek a 2012 Playful City USA. KaBOOM! selected Coconut Creek for its outstanding dedication to play.

Coconut Creek is adjacent to "Mount Trashmore", officially known as the Monarch Hill Renewable Energy Park, which has long emitted foul odours into the air of the city. In September 2010, after threatening to sue over the landfill's odours, Coconut Creek reached an agreement with Waste Management, Inc., the operator of the landfill, that prohibits food and other decaying materials from going into Mount Trashmore after October 2, 2013.

Geography

Coconut Creek is located at  (26.275010, –80.184719). The city is in northern Broward County. It is bounded by unincorporated Palm Beach County on the north, by the cities of Parkland, Coral Springs and Margate on its west, by Deerfield Beach on its east, and by Pompano Beach on its east and southeast.

Climate
According to the Köppen climate classification, Coconut Creek has a tropical savanna climate. The warmest month of the year is August with an average maximum temperature of 93 °F, while the coldest month of the year is January with an average minimum temperature of 58 °F. The annual average precipitation at Coconut Creek is 57.27 inches. Summer months tend to be wetter than winter months. The wettest month of the year is June with an average rainfall of 7.31 Inches.

Demographics

2020 census

As of the 2020 United States census, there were 57,833 people, 23,277 households, and 14,236 families residing in the city.

2010 census

As of 2010, there were 25,926 households, with 12.2% being vacant. In 2000, there were 20,093 households, out of which 22.0% had children under the age of 18 living with them, 49.4% were married couples living together, 7.7% had a female householder with no husband present, and 40.1% were non-families. 32.5% of all households were made up of individuals, and 18.0% had someone living alone who was 65 years of age or older. The average household size was 2.16 and the average family size was 2.73.

2000 census
In 2000, the city the population was spread out, with 18.0% under the age of 18, 5.6% from 18 to 24, 31.3% from 25 to 44, 18.6% from 45 to 64, and 26.5% who were 65 years of age or older. The median age was 41 years. For every 100 females, there were 86.8 males. For every 100 females age 18 and over, there were 82.5 males.

As of 2000, the median income for a household in the city was $43,980, and the median income for a family was $55,131. Males had a median income of $40,965 versus $31,188 for females. The per capita income for the city was $25,590. About 5.1% of families and 7.1% of the population were below the poverty line, including 10.5% of those under age 18 and 5.3% of those age 65 or over.

As of 2000, speakers of English as a first language accounted for 79.23% of residents, and Spanish made up of 11.18%. Other languages spoken as a first language were Portuguese 1.79%, Italian 1.40%, Yiddish 1.37%, and French at 1.17% of the population.

As of 2000, Coconut Creek was the twenty-sixth most Brazilian-populated area in the U.S. (tied with Belle Isle, Big Pine Key, and several other areas in the Northeast) at 1.2% of the population.

Economy

Largest employers
According to the city's 2018 Comprehensive Annual Financial Report, the largest employers in the city are:

Education
Coconut Creek is served by seven public schools operated by Broward County Public Schools.

Elementary schools
Coconut Creek Elementary
Tradewinds Elementary
Winston Park Elementary
 Outside of the city limits: Liberty Elementary in Margate

Middle school
Lyons Creek Middle School
Outside of the city limits: Margate Middle School in Margate

High schools
Coconut Creek High School
Monarch High School
Atlantic Technical Center and Technical High School - magnet school for the northern part of the county

Private schools
North Broward Preparatory School

Higher education
Broward College (North Campus)
Technological University of America

Points of interest
American Top Team headquarters
Butterfly World in Tradewinds Park
Coconut Creek Community Center
Coconut Creek Recreation Complex
Goldcoast Ballroom
Sabal Pines Park
Seminole Casino Coconut Creek
The Promenade at Coconut Creek

Notable people
Thiago Alves, UFC fighter
Jana Bieger, gymnast
Lepa Brena, Serbian singer
Bobby Cannavale, actor
Jason Derulo, singer
Wilson Gouveia, UFC fighter
Mat Latos, MLB pitcher, Cincinnati Reds, San Diego Padres, Miami Marlins and Los Angeles Dodgers
Robbie Lawler, UFC fighter, former welterweight champion
Ricardo Liborio, former professional fighter, co-owner American Top Team, MMA instructor, U.S. wrestling coach
Hector Lombard, UFC fighter, former Bellator Middleweight Champion
Calvin Ridley, NFL wide receiver for the Atlanta Falcons
Yoel Romero, UFC fighter, former World Champion, and Olympic silver medalist in freestyle wrestling
Gregory Rousseau, NFL player for the Buffalo Bills
Thiago Silva, UFC fighter
Andrew Yogan, hockey player
Jazz Jennings, LGBTQ+ advocate

References

External links 

 

 
Cities in Broward County, Florida
Populated places established in 1967
Cities in Florida
1967 establishments in Florida